The Ludwigshöhe is a mountain in the Pennine Alps on the Swiss-Italian border. It is situated near the Dufourspitze in the Monte Rosa Massif. The summit is the tripoint between Valais, Aosta Valley and Piedmont.

See also

List of 4000 metre peaks of the Alps

References

External links
 Ludwigshöhe on Summitpost
 Ludwigshöhe on Hikr

Mountains of the Alps
Alpine four-thousanders
Mountains of Switzerland
Mountains of Italy
Italy–Switzerland border
International mountains of Europe
Mountains of Valais
Monte Rosa
Four-thousanders of Switzerland